The Mid-Western Regional Council is a local government area in the Central West region of New South Wales, Australia. The area is located adjacent to the Castlereagh Highway that passes through the middle of the area in an approximate southeast–northwest direction.

Mid-Western Regional Council was proclaimed on 26 May 2004 and incorporates the whole of the former Mudgee Shire Council and parts of the former Merriwa and Rylstone Shires. The Mid-Western Regional Council also incorporated the area of the historic Wyaldra Shire, which was abolished in an earlier round of local government amalgamations. A historic building in Gulgong, built in 1910, served as the former shire headquarters.

The mayor of Mid-Western Regional Council is Cr. Des Kennedy, who is unaligned with any political party.

Towns and localities
The largest town and council seat is Mudgee.  The region also includes the towns of Gulgong, Rylstone and Kandos, the villages of Bylong and Ilford, and the locality Bombira. Most of the LGA is agricultural with a strong presence from coal mining, but it includes several historical towns.

Council

Current composition and election method
Mid-Western Regional Council is composed of nine councillors elected proportionally as a single ward. All councillors are elected for a fixed four-year term of office. The mayor is elected by the councillors at the first meeting of the council. The most recent election was held on 10 September 2016, and the makeup of the council is as follows:

The current Council, elected in 2012, in order of election, is:

References 

 
Local government areas of New South Wales